Meryl Aitken O'Hara Wood, née Waxman (died 6 May 1958) was an Australian tennis player active in the 1920s and 30s.

Career
Wood won the women's doubles title at the Australian Championships (now the Australian Open) in 1926 and 1927. She won the 1926 title with compatriot Esna Boyd, defeating Daphne Akhurst and Marjorie Cox in the final in three close sets: 6–3, 6–8, 8–6. She successfully defended her title the following year with partner Louie Bickerton, winning in the final against Esna Boyd and Sylvia Lance in two straight sets.

On 3 August 1923, she married Australian tennis player Pat O'Hara Wood.

Grand Slam finals

Doubles (2 titles, 2 runners-up)

Mixed doubles (1 runner-up)

References

Year of birth missing
1958 deaths
Australian Championships (tennis) champions
Australian female tennis players
Grand Slam (tennis) champions in women's doubles
Place of birth missing